Gangalidda is a coastal locality in the Aboriginal Shire of Doomadgee, Queensland, Australia, on the Gulf of Carpentaria.

History 
In 1933 the Doomadgee Aboriginal Mission was established at Bayley Point by the Open Brethren. However, the location was remote and lacked a reliable water supply.

Prior to the creation of the Aboriginal Shire of Doomadgee in 2007, this land around the Bayley Point area was part of the locality of Nicholson in the Shire of Burke. After the creation of the new shire in 2007, the land became part of the new shire but retained the name of Nicholson. On 28 August 2009, it was renamed Gangalidda (the Yukulta / Ganggalidda people being one of the two traditional owners of the land in the Doomadgee area, the other being the Waanyi people).

Geography
The waters of the Gulf of Carpentaria form the north-eastern boundary.

References 

Aboriginal Shire of Doomadgee
Coastline of Queensland
Localities in Queensland